The 1999 Bauchi State gubernatorial election occurred in Nigeria on January 9, 1999. The PDP nominee, Adamu Mu'azu, polled 56% of total vote to win the election, defeating the APP candidate and others.

Adamu Mu'azu defeated Alhaji Tafawa Balewa at the PDP primary election to become the party's candidate. His running mate was Abdulmalik Mohammed.

Electoral system
The Governor of Bauchi State is elected using the plurality voting system.

Results
PDP's Adamu Mu'azu emerged emerged winner in the contest.

The total number of registered voters in the state for the election was 1,941,913. However, 1,997,000 were previously issued voting cards in the state.

References 

Bauchi State gubernatorial elections
Bauchi State gubernatorial election
Bauchi State gubernatorial election